The 1960 Cork Intermediate Hurling Championship was the 51st staging of the Cork Intermediate Hurling Championship since its establishment by the Cork County Board in 1909.

On 4 September 1960, Passage won the championship following a 3–07 to 1–08 defeat of St. Vincent's in the final at Riverstick Sportsfield. This was their third championship title overall and their first title since 1930.

Results

First round

Quarter-finals

Semi-finals

Final

Championship statistics

Miscellaneous

 Carrigaline were thrown out of the championship after qualifying for the final after an objection by Passage was upheld by the County Board. The objection was lodged by Passage on the grounds that one of the Carrigaline players had played foreign games.

References

Cork Intermediate Hurling Championship
Cork Intermediate Hurling Championship